The 2008 NORCECA Beach Volleyball Circuit at El Salvador was held April 23–28, 2008 in San Salvador, El Salvador. It was the third leg of the NORCECA Beach Volleyball Circuit 2008.

Women's competition

Men's competition

References
 Norceca

El Salvador
Norceca Beach Volleyball Circuit (El Salvador), 2008
International volleyball competitions hosted by El Salvador